Elections for Coventry City Council were held on Thursday 6 May 2010.  As the council is elected by thirds, one seat in each of the wards was up for election.

Labour gained five seats (Cheylesmore, Foleshill, Sherbourne, Whoberley, Wyken) from the Conservatives and one seat (St Michael's) from the Socialist Party.
As a result, Labour gained control of the council, with 30 out of 54 seats.

A general election was held on the same day, which accounts for the higher turnout.

Election result

Council Composition
The composition of the council before and after the election can be found in the following table:

Ward results

References

2010 English local elections
May 2010 events in the United Kingdom
2010
2010s in Coventry